Fantastic Beasts is a film series directed by David Yates, and a spin-off prequel to the Harry Potter novel and film series. The series is distributed by Warner Bros. and consists of three fantasy films as of 2022, beginning with Fantastic Beasts and Where to Find Them (2016), and following with Fantastic Beasts: The Crimes of Grindelwald (2018) and Fantastic Beasts: The Secrets of Dumbledore (2022). Following the 2001–11 Harry Potter film series, Fantastic Beasts marks the second film series in the Wizarding World shared universe media franchise.

The series was mainly produced by David Heyman, and stars Eddie Redmayne as the leading character: Newt Scamander, with Jude Law portraying Albus Dumbledore and with Colin Farrell, Johnny Depp and Mads Mikkelsen (replacing Depp in the third film) all portraying the third leading character: main antagonist Gellert Grindelwald. Ezra Miller, Katherine Waterston, Alison Sudol, Dan Fogler, Victoria Yeates, Jessica Williams, Callum Turner, and Richard Coyle also star. Rowling wrote the screenplays for each film, with Steve Kloves returning from the Harry Potter film series to co-write the third film: The Secrets of Dumbledore. Production has taken place over six years, with the main story arc following Dumbledore and his agents' quest to overcome Grindelwald, his lost love, as the First Wizarding War and Second World War approach.

Fantastic Beasts and Where to Find Them was released worldwide on 18 November 2016, followed by The Crimes of Grindelwald on 16 November 2018, and The Secrets of Dumbledore on 15 April 2022. The series has been commercially successful, having collectively grossed $1.8 billion across three films so far. However, the series has had a mixed critical reception, with many critics deeming it inferior to the Harry Potter films.

Origins

In 2010, a film adaptation of the Derek Landy novel series Skulduggery Pleasant starring Johnny Depp as the title character was in development at Warner Bros.; immensely disliking the script, series author Derek Landy bought back the rights by December. In April 2021, elaborating on the original script's content while promoting Until the End, Landy said that it had contained numerous references to the events of Harry Potter in the context of it being set in the same fictional universe, featuring the characters having wands instead of wield magic out-of-hand as in his books. On 12 September 2013, two years following the conclusion of the Harry Potter film series with Harry Potter and the Deathly Hallows – Part 2, Warner Bros. announced a new attempt as expanding the fictional universe of Harry Potter into a "Wizarding World", with J. K. Rowling developing a script for a prequel film, titled after a "textbook" Rowling had written in 2001 to be sold to raise money for the British charity Comic Relief, based on the in-universe textbook of the same name from her Harry Potter novel series. Set seventy years before the adventures of Harry Potter and following the adventures of its fictional author Newt Scamander, the film would mark both Rowling's screenwriting debut and the first intended installment in a new series, tentatively entitled Fantastic Beasts. According to Rowling, after Warner Bros. suggested an adaptation of either Fantastic Beasts or Quidditch Through the Ages, she wrote a rough draft of the script in twelve days. She said, "It wasn't a great draft but it did show the shape of how it might look. So that is how it all started." In March 2014, it was announced that a trilogy was scheduled with the first instalment set in New York, and seeing the return of producer David Heyman, as well as writer Steve Kloves, both veterans of the Potter film series.

Production

In June 2015, Eddie Redmayne was cast in the lead role of Newt Scamander, the Wizarding World's preeminent magizoologist. Other cast members include: Katherine Waterston as Tina Goldstein, Alison Sudol as Queenie Goldstein, Dan Fogler as Jacob Kowalski, Ezra Miller as Credence Barebone, Samantha Morton as Mary Lou, Jenn Murray as Chastity Barebone, Faith Wood-Blagrove as Modesty Barebone, and Colin Farrell as Percival Graves / Gellert Grindelwald. Principal photography began on 17 August 2015, at Warner Bros. Studios, Leavesden. After two months, the production moved to St George's Hall in Liverpool, which was transformed into 1920s New York City. Fantastic Beasts and Where to Find Them was released worldwide on 18 November 2016.

The second film was announced in March 2014. In October 2016, it was revealed that Yates and Rowling would return as director, and screenwriter and co-producer, and Redmayne would be returning to play the lead role of Newt Scamander in  all the series' films. In November 2016, it was confirmed that Johnny Depp will have a starring role in the sequel, reprising his cameo role as Gellert Grindelwald from the first instalment, replacing Farrell. Later that same month it was also announced that Albus Dumbledore would be appearing in future instalments, albeit with a younger actor for the prequel film series, intended to eventually supplant Redmayne's Scamander as protagonist of the series. In April 2017, it was confirmed that Jude Law had been cast as Dumbledore. with the film being short and set in New York City, Britain, and Paris. Principal photography began on 3 July 2017, at Warner Bros. Studios, Leavesden, and wrapped on 20 December 2017, with Fantastic Beasts: The Crimes of Grindelwald releasing on 16 November 2018.

Originally scheduled to begin filming in July 2019, and released in November 2020, production of the third film was pushed back to late 2019 to allow more time polishing the script and re-plan the future of the Fantastic Beasts series. In 2018 on Twitter, Rowling promised that the third film would give answers to the questions left unsolved in the first two. In October 2019, Dan Fogler claimed that principal photography on the third film would begin in February 2020. In November 2019, it was announced that the script had been written by both Rowling and Steve Kloves, the latter of whom returned after being absent as a writer on the first two. On 16 March 2020, the very day that principal photography would begin, the COVID-19 pandemic prompted Warner Bros. to postpone production of its third Fantastic Beasts film. This made the film be postponed again, from a 12 November 2021 to a 15 July 2022 release. On 20 August 2020, filming was confirmed to start in September. On 20 September 2020, Eddie Redmayne confirmed that filming was two weeks underway with safety precautions in place to keep the cast and crew safe from COVID-19. On 6 November 2020, Johnny Depp informed that Warner Bros. asked him to step down as Grindelwald and he accepted to do it. Later, on 25 November 2020, Warner Bros. announced that Mads Mikkelsen would replace Depp in the role of Grindelwald. On 3 February 2021, filming in the UK was shut down after a production member tested positive for COVID-19. Composer James Newton Howard confirmed later that month that production had wrapped filming. In September 2021, the film's release was pushed forward three months to 15 April 2022, alongside the announcement of the full title: Fantastic Beasts: The Secrets of Dumbledore. It premiered one week early in a few European and Asian countries.

Films

Fantastic Beasts and Where to Find Them (2016)

In 1926, Newt Scamander arrives in New York City with his magically expanded briefcase which houses a number of dangerous creatures and their habitats. When some creatures escape from his briefcase, Newt must battle to correct the mistake, and the horrors of the resultant increase in violence, fear, and tension felt between magical and non-magical people (No-Maj).

Fantastic Beasts: The Crimes of Grindelwald (2018)

A few months have passed since the events of Fantastic Beasts and Where to Find Them. Gellert Grindelwald has escaped imprisonment and has begun gathering followers to his causeelevating wizards above all non-magical beings. Dumbledore must seek help from his former student Newt to put a stop to Grindelwald.

Fantastic Beasts: The Secrets of Dumbledore (2022)

Several years after the events of The Crimes of Grindelwald, the story begins in the UK, the US and China and proceeds to take place partly in Berlin, Germany and partly in Bhutan, Asia and leads up to the Wizarding World's involvement in World War II, as Newt Scamander and company returning for another adventurous journey through the wizarding world, attempting to defeat the maniacal Gellert Grindelwald despite Albus Dumbledore being unable to fight against him.

Future
In October 2016, Rowling announced that the Fantastic Beasts film series would be composed of five films, later confirming that the story of the series would consist of a sequence of events that occurred between the years of 1926 and 1945. In February 2022, producer David Heyman revealed that work on the script for Fantastic Beasts 4 had not begun yet. In April 2022, Variety reported that Warner Bros. greenlighting the final two installments would be dependent on the critical and commercial performance of The Secrets of Dumbledore. In November 2022, Variety reported that Warner Bros. Discovery had no Wizarding World films in active development and was not in "active discussions" with Rowling regarding the future of the franchise, casting the future of the Fantastic Beasts films into further uncertainty.

Television
In January 2021, it was reported that Warner Bros. were reviewing pitches for a television series, set in the Wizarding World, to debut on HBO Max. In May 2022, the reports circulated about the announced meeting between Warner Bros. Discovery CEO David Zaslav and J.K. Rowling in their discussion for future HBO Max projects set within the Wizarding World.

Fantastic Beasts: A Natural History
Fantastic Beasts: A Natural History is a documentary film that was broadcast on BBC One and HBO Max on 27 February 2022. Presented by Stephen Fry, the documentary tells magical stories about mythical creatures and beasts from J. K. Rowling's works and their connection to real life animals.

Short film
Fantastic Beasts of the TSA aired on The Late Late Show with James Corden, on November 17, 2016. Featuring Eddie Redmayne reprise his Fantastic Beasts role as Newt Scamander, the film follows Scamander in modern times as he seeks to get his suitcase through airport security, past an overzealous Transportation Security Administration (TSA) agent (played by the show's host, James Corden).

Books

Fantastic Beasts and Where to Find Them - The Original Screenplay
Fantastic Beasts and Where to Find Them - The Original Screenplay is an official book containing the original screenplay written by J. K. Rowling for the film of the same name.
On 1 September 2016, Pottermore released the final covers for the UK and US editions of the screenplay. The cover artwork and interior illustrations were designed by Miraphora Mina and Eduardo Lima, the founders of MinaLima.

Fantastic Beasts: The Crimes of Grindelwald - The Original Screenplay
Fantastic Beasts: The Crimes of Grindelwald - The Original Screenplay was released on 16 November 2018, the same day the film premiered in the UK and US. It was released in both book form and digital form. The events of the screenplay followed the screenplay of the second film. It was written by J. K. Rowling. The cover was designed by MinaLima Design. The book does not contain Rowling's original version, but has been edited to align with the final theatrical cut of the film. As such it does not include any deleted or extended scenes and has been updated to incorporate ad-libbed or modified dialogue.

Fantastic Beasts: The Secrets of Dumbledore - The Complete Screenplay
Fantastic Beasts: The Secrets of Dumbledore - The Complete Screenplay is the screenplay for Fantastic Beasts: The Secrets of Dumbledore. It was released on 19 July 2022. The book was designed by Paul Kepple and Alex Bruce at Headcase Design. The events of the screenplay follows the screenplay of the third film. It was written by J. K. Rowling and Steve Kloves.

Video games

Music

Reception

Box office performance
Fantastic Beasts and Where to Find Them was the eighth highest-grossing film of 2016, and The Crimes of Grindelwald was the tenth highest-grossing film of 2018.

Critical and public response
The series has received mixed critical reception being deemed critically inferior to the more positively reviewed Harry Potter films.

Accolades

Academy Awards
In 2017, Fantastic Beasts and Where to Find Them won the Academy Award for Best Costume Design, becoming the first film in the overall Wizarding World franchise to win an Academy Award.

British Academy Film Awards

Theme park attraction
Fantastic Beasts: The Wonder of Nature was open from 9–15 December 2020 and from 17 May 2021 to 3 January 2022 at the Natural History Museum. It consisted of creatures, specimens and artefacts from the museum's scientific collection displayed side by side with elements from the Wizarding World as well as digital installations. This exhibit featured 100 objects, including props from the Fantastic Beasts and Harry Potter films. There is a similar exhibition set to open at the Royal Ontario Museum in Toronto, Canada on 11 June 2022 through 2 January 2023.

References

External links

 
 Growing Up with Harry Potter – photo essay by Time

 
Warner Bros. Pictures franchises
American film series
BAFTA Outstanding British Contribution to Cinema Award
British film series
Films about magic
Films about witchcraft
Film series based on fantasy books
Film series introduced in 2016
Works based on Harry Potter